The following is a list of women found in the Hebrew and Christian Bibles. The list appears in alphabetical order.

A
Abigail – mother of Amasa, Sister of David. I Chronicles 2:15–17
Abigail – wife of the wicked Nabal, who became a wife of David after Nabal's death. I Samuel 25
 Abihail #1 – wife of Abishur and mother of Ahban and Molid. I Chronicles
Abihail #2 – wife of king Rehoboam II Chronicles 
 Abishag – concubine of aged King David. I Kings
Abital – one of King David's wives II Samuel; I Chronicles
 Achsah (or Acsah) – daughter of Caleb. When Caleb promised her to Othniel in marriage, she requested that he increased her dowry to include not only land, but springs of water as well. Joshua, Judges, I Chronicles
Adah – Adah # 1 – wife of Lamech, Genesis
Adah – Adah #2 – daughter of Elon, the Hittite and one of the wives of Esau. Possibly original name of Bashemath. Genesis
 Ahinoam #1 – wife of King Saul, mother of Michal (wife of King David) I Samuel
 Ahinoam #2 – one of King David's wives, mother of Amnon. I Samuel; II Samuel; I Chronicles
 Aholibamah (or Oholibamah) – Daughter of Anah and one of Esau's wives. Also called Judith. Genesis
 Anna the Prophetess – aged Jewish prophetess who prophesied about Jesus at the Temple of Jerusalem. Luke
 Asenath – Egyptian wife of Joseph. Genesis
Ashtoreth –   Ancient Near Eastern goddess that mentioned in Judges, 1 Kings, and 2 Kings
 Atarah – second wife of Jerahmeel. I Chronicles
Athaliah – Queen of Judah during the reign of King Jehoram, and later became sole ruler of Judah for five years. II Kings, II Chronicles
 Azubah #1 – Caleb's wife. I Chronicles
 Azubah #2 – wife of King Asa, 3rd king of Judah, and mother of Jehoshaphat.  I Kings, II Chronicles

B
 Baara – Moabitess, wife of Shaharaim. I Chronicles
 Basemeth #1 – daughter of Elon, the Hittite, One of the wives of Esau. Genesis
 Basemeth #2 – daughter of Ishmael and 3rd wife of Esau. Genesis
 Basemeth #3 – daughter of Solomon, wife of Ahimaaz. I Kings
Bathsheba – wife of Uriah the Hittite and later of David, king of the United Kingdom of Israel and Judah. She was the mother of Solomon, who succeeded David as king. II Samuel, I Kings, I Chronicles
 Berenice – sister of King Agrippa Acts 25:13; Acts 25:23 and Acts 26:30
 Bilhah – Rachel's handmaid and a concubine of Jacob who bears him two sons, Dan and Naphtali. Genesis
 Bithiah – Pharaoh's daughter (Exodus). Also identified with/as Asiya in Muslim interpretations. Wife of Mered, a descendant of Judah. 1 Chronicles 4

C
 Candace – Ethiopian queen; a eunuch under her authority and in charge of her treasury was witnessed to by Philip the Evangelist, led to God and baptized. Acts
 Chloe – mentioned in Corinthians. Means “Green herb”.
 Claudia – greeted by Paul the Apostle. 2 Timothy
 Cozbi – A Midianite princess who was killed by Phinehas (grandson of Aaron) because her evil influence was seen as the source of a plague among the Israelites according to Numbers 25. The incident was then taken as a pretext for the War against the Midianites in Numbers 31.

D
Damaris. Acts
 Deborah #1 – Nursemaid to Rebekah and later to Jacob and Esau. Genesis
Deborah #2 – Prophetess and the fourth, and the only female, Judge of pre–monarchic Israel in the Old Testament. Judges
Delilah – The "woman in the valley of Sorek" who Samson loved. Judges
Dinah – Daughter of Jacob, one of the patriarchs of the Israelites and Leah, his first wife. Genesis
Dorcas, also known as Tabitha. Acts
Drusilla – The wife of a judge named Felix, mentioned in Acts 24:24.

E
 Eglah – One of King David's wives. II Samuel, I Chronicles
Elizabeth – Mother of John the Baptist and the wife of Zacharias. Luke
 Elisheba – Wife of Aaron. Exodus
 Ephah – one of the concubines of Caleb (prince of Judah) I Chronicles
 Ephrath – Second wife of Caleb (the spy) I Chronicles
Esther (her Hebrew name was Hadassah) – Queen of the Persian Empire in the Hebrew Bible, the queen of Ahasuerus. Esther
Eunice – mother of Timothy
Euodia – Christian of the church in Philippi 
Eve – First woman, wife of Adam. Genesis

G
Gomer – Wife of Hosea and a prostitute. Hosea

H
Hagar – Egyptian handmaiden of Sarah, wife of Abraham. Hagar became the mother of one of Abraham's sons, Ishmael. Genesis
 Herodia 
 Haggith – Wife of King David, mother of Adoniyah II Samuel, I Kings, I Chronicles
 Hammolekheth – possibly rules over portion of Gilead. I Chronicles
 Hamutal – Wife of Josiah and mother of "ungodly" sons Jehoahaz and Mattaniah. II Kings, Jeremiah
Hannah – A prophetess and worshipper at Jerusalem. Mother of Samuel. I Samuel
 Hazzelelponi – daughter of Etam, tribe of Judah I Chronicles
 Helah – I Chronicles
 Hephziba – Wife of King Hezekiah and mother of Manasseh, who undid Hezekiah's good works. II Kings
 Hodesh – one of the wives of Shaharaim I Chronicles
 Hodiah's wife – I Chronicles
 Hogla (or Hoglah) – One of the five daughters of Zelophehad who fought and won the right to inherit their deceased father's property. Numbers, Joshua
Huldah – Prophetess II Kings, II Chronicles
 Hushim – One of the wives of Shaharaim I Chronicles

I
 Iscah – Daughter of Abraham's younger brother Haran Genesis

J
Jael – Heroine who killed Sisera to deliver Israel from the troops of king Jabin. She was the wife of Heber the Kenite. Judges
 Jecholiah (or Jecoliah) – Wife of Amaziah (King of Judah) and mother of Uzziah. II Kings, II Chronicles
 Jedidah – Wife of wicked king Manessah and mother of Josiah. II Kings
 Jehoaddan (or Jehoaddin) – II Kings, II Chronicles
 Jehosheba (or Jehoshebeath/Josaba) – Daughter of Jehoram and wife of Jehoiada. She saved her nephew Jehoash from massacre. II Kings
 Jemima – One of Job's daughters. Job
 Jerioth – Wife of Caleb (son of Hezron) I Chronicles
 Jerusha – Daughter of Zadok, a priest, wife of King Uzziah and mother of Jotham. II Kings, I Chronicles, II Chronicles
Jezebel #1 – Queen of ancient Israel. I Kings, II Kings
Jezebel #2 – false prophetess. Revelation
Joanna – One of the women who went to prepare Jesus' body for burial. Luke
Jochebed – Mother of Moses, Aaron, and Miriam. Exodus, Numbers
Judith – Hittite wife of Esau. Genesis
Julia – Minor character in the new testament Romans 
Junia or Junias – Regarded highly by St. Paul in Romans. An apostle.

K
Keren–Happuch – One of Job's daughters. Job
Keturah – Wife of Abraham after Sarah's death. Genesis, I Chronicles
Keziah – Second daughter of Job. Job

L
Leah – First wife of Jacob who was given to him in place of Rachel whom he loved. Genesis, Ruth
Lois, grandmother of Saint Timothy. II Timothy
Lo–Ruhamah – Daughter of Hosea and Gomer. Hosea
Lydia of Thyatira – the first converted believer after the resurrection, and the first to introduce it in to her household.  She was a successful business woman and she was pivotal to the spread of the name of Jesus. Acts

M
Maacah, the daughter of King Talmi of Geshur, was married to King David and bore him his son Absalom. 2 Samuel 3:3 [also spelled Maakah]
Maacah – 2nd wife of King Rehoboam. Mother of Abijah, Attai, Ziza and Shelomith. Rehoboam loved Maacah more than any other of his wives or concubines. "II Chronicles"
Maacah #2 – Sister of Makir, father of Gilead. Mentioned one verse later is Makir's wife, also named Maacah. "I Chronicles"
Mahalath – daughter of Ishmael and 3rd wife of Esau. Genesis
Mahalath – granddaughter of David and the first wife of King Rehoboam. II Chronicles
Mahlah – one of the daughters of Zelophehad Numbers, JoshuaNumbers 26:33; 27:1; 36:11
Mahlah – I ChroniclesMartha – Luke, JohnJohn 11:1, 5, 19–28, 30, 38–40; 12:2
Mary – Mother of Jesus. Matthew, Mark, Luke, John, Acts, GalatiansMark 3:31–35; 6:3John 2:1–5, 12; 6:42; 19:25–27Galatians 4:4
Mary the mother of James and Joses (or Joseph). MatthewMary the mother of John Mark ActsMary the sister of Martha. Luke, JohnMary the wife of Cleophas. JohnMary who was greeted by Paul. RomansMary Magdalene – Disciple of Jesus Matthew, Mark, Luke, JohnMark 15:40–41, 47; 16:1–8John 19:25; 20:1–2, 11–18
Matred – Genesis, I ChroniclesI Chronicles 1:50
Medium of En Dor – 1 Samuel 28Mehetabel – daughter of Matred. Genesis; I ChroniclesMerab – King Saul's oldest daughter. I SamuelMe-Zahab – Mother of Matred, grandmother of Mehetabel."Genesis, I Chronicles" "I Chronicles 1:50"
Michal – daughter of Saul and wife of David. I Samuel, II Samuel, I ChroniclesII Samuel 3:13–16; 6:16, 20–23
Milcah – wife of Nahor and daughter of Haran. Genesis"Genesis 22:20"
Milcah – one of the daughters of Zelophehad. Numbers, JoshuaMiriam – Moses' sister. Exodus, Numbers, Deuteronomy, I ChroniclesNumbers 12:1, 4–5, 10, 12, 14–15; 20:1; 26:59I Chronicles 6:3
Miriam – woman of Judah. I ChroniclesMother of King Lemuel – mother of King Lemuel that gave him the prophetic instruction that became Proverbs 31

N
Naamah – Sister of Tubal-cain. GenesisNaamah – Mother of King Rehoboam. "II Chronicles"
Naarah – wife of Asher, tribe of Judah. I ChroniclesNaomi – mother–in–law to Ruth. RuthNoa – daughter of Zelophehad. NumbersNoadiah – prophetess. Nehemiah

O
Orpah – Sister-in-law to Ruth. RuthP
Peninnah – Wife of Elkanah. I Samuel
Persis – a "woman who has worked hard in the Lord" whom Paul the Apostle greeted. Romans.
Phoebe – A deaconess of the church of Cenchrea. Romans
Priscilla – wife of Aquila, and missionary partner to Paul the Apostle. Acts, Romans, I Corinthians, II TimothyRomans 16:3–4II Timothy 4:19
Puah – one of two midwives who saved the Hebrew boys. Exodus

R
Rachel – second wife of Jacob, and sister of Leah. Mother of Joseph and Benjamin. Genesis, I Samuel, Jeremiah, MatthewI Samuel 10:2Matthew 2:18
Rahab – of Jericho. Joshua, Matthew, Hebrews, JamesMatthew 1:5;James 2:25
Rebekah – wife of Isaac and the mother of Jacob and Esau. Genesis, RomansRomans 9:10
Reumah – concubine of Abraham's brother Nahor. GenesisRhoda – ActsRizpah – daughter of Aiah and one of the concubines of King Saul. II SamuelRuth – Boaz and Ruth get married and have a son named Obed. Obed is the descendant of Perez the son of Judah, and the grandfather of (king) David. Ruth, MatthewMatthew 1:5

S
Salome #1 – daughter of Herodias. Name in Hebrew reads שלומית (Shlomit) and is derived from Shalom שלום, meaning "peace". Matthew, MarkMark 6:21–29
Salome #2 – a follower of Jesus present at his crucifixion as well as the empty tomb. Mark
Samaritan woman at the well, or Photine is a well known figure from the Gospel of John
Sapphira – ActsSarah #1 – wife of Abraham and the mother of Isaac. Her name was originally "Sarai". According to Genesis 17:15 God changed her name to Sarah as part of a covenant with Yahweh after Hagar bore Abraham a son Ishmael. Genesis, Isaiah, Romans, Galatians, Hebrews, I PeterIsaiah 51:2Galatians 4:22–24, 26, 30–31I Peter 3:6
Sarah #2 – wife of Tobias. Tobit
Serah –  daughter of Asher mentioned briefly in Genesis. Genesis 
Sheerah – founded three towns. Descendant of Ephraim. I ChroniclesShelomit – mother of blasphemer. LeviticusShelomit – daughter of Zerubbabel, sister of Meshullam and Hananiah. I ChroniclesShiphrah – one of two midwives who saved the Hebrew boys. ExodusShua – daughter of Heber that mentioned in 1 Chronicles 7.
Susanna #1 – a woman who was nearly sentenced to death due to false adultery accusations before being saved by Daniel. Daniel
Susanna #2 – A follower of Jesus. Luke
Syntyche – Christian of the church in Philippi mentioned with Euodia 

T
Tahpenes – an Egyptian queen mentioned in the First Book of Kings.
Tamar #1 – daughter-in-law of Judah, as well as the mother of two of his children, the twins Zerah and Perez. GenesisTamar #2 – daughter of King David, and sister of Absalom. Her mother was Maacah, daughter of Talmai, king of Geshur. II SamuelTamar #3 – daughter of David's son Absalom. II SamuelTaphath – daughter of Solomon
Tharbis – according to Josephus, a Cushite princess who married Moses prior to his marriage to Zipporah as told in the Book of Exodus. This name is not found in the Bible, and there is debate on if "the Kushite" refers to Zipporah herself or a second woman (Tharbis). 
Timnah (or Timna) – concubine of Eliphaz and mother of Amalek. GenesisTirzah – one of the daughters of Zelophehad. Numbers, JoshuaTabitha (Acts 9:36) – from Joppa, Tabitha was always doing good and helping the poor. AKA 'Dorcas'
Tryphena and Tryphosa are Christian women mentioned in Romans 16:12 of the Bible ("Salute Tryphena and Tryphosa, who labour in the Lord." KJV)

V
Vashti – queen, and wife of King Ahasuerus. EstherZ
Zibiah – mother of Joash
Zeresh – wife of Haman. EstherZeruiah – daughter or stepdaughter of Jesse of the Tribe of Judah, was an older sister of King David. Zeruiah had three sons, Abishai, Joab, and Asahel, all of whom were soldiers in David's army. II Samuel, I ChroniclesI Chronicles 2:16
Zillah – wife of Lamech and the mother of Tubal-cain and Naamah. GenesisZilpah – Leah's handmaid who becomes a wife of Jacob and bears him two sons Gad and Asher. GenesisZipporah – wife of Moses, daughter of Jethro. Exodus''
Zuleika – Potiphar's wife and Asenath's mother. Asenath married Joseph, so she is the grandmother of Ephraim and Manasseh (Tribe of Joseph). She is given no name in the Bible, but is known as Zuleika (among other spellings) in Islamic and Jewish traditions.

See also
List of minor biblical figures
List of names for the biblical nameless
Female disciples of Jesus

References

Bible-related lists of people
Gender in the Bible
Judaism and women
Bible